Qu Qingshan (born May 1957) is a Chinese politician currently serving as president of the . He is a member of the 19th Central Committee of the Chinese Communist Party.

Early life
Qu was born in Rongcheng, Shandong, in May 1957.

Career in Qinghai
During the late Cultural Revolution in December 1973, he worked as a sent-down youth in Donggou Township of Guide County in northwest China's Qinghai province. He joined the Chinese Communist Party in March 1975. After working at Qinghai Native Products Company as league secretary for three years, he was admitted to Shaanxi Normal University, where he majored in history. After graduating in 1982, he was dispatched to Qinghai Machine Tool Foundry as an official. In April 1984, he was transferred to the Lecturer Group of Theoretical Education for Cadres of CCP Qinghai Provincial Committee, where he successively served as lecturer, deputy head, and head. In October 1997, he became vice president of Qinghai Academy of Social Sciences, but having held the position for only two years. He served as deputy head of the Propaganda Department of CCP Qinghai Provincial Committee in November 1999, and over a year later promoted to the head position. In May 2002, he was admitted to member of the standing committee of the CPC Qinghai Provincial Committee, the province's top authority.

Career in Beijing
After working in Qinghai for 36 years, he was transferred to Beijing in 2009. In March 2018, the Party History Research Center of the Central Committee of the Chinese Communist Party was revoked and its function was merged into the newly founded , he was appointed executive vice president, one year later, he rose to become president, a position at ministerial level.

References

1957 births
Living people
People from Rongcheng, Shandong
Shaanxi Normal University alumni
Central Party School of the Chinese Communist Party alumni
People's Republic of China politicians from Shandong
Chinese Communist Party politicians from Shandong